Des is a masculine given name, mostly a short form (hypocorism) of Desmond. People named Des include:

People 

 Des Buckingham, English football manager
 Des Corcoran, (1928–2004), Australian politician
 Des Dillon (disambiguation), several people
 Des Hasler (born 1961), Australian rugby league player-coach
 Desmond Des Kelly (born 1965), British journalist
 Desmond Des Lynam (born 1942), British television presenter
 Desmond Des Lyttle (born 1971), English footballer
 Desmond Des O'Connor (1932–2020), British entertainer
 Des O'Connor, Australian rugby league player in the 1970s
 Desmond Des O'Grady (born 1953), Irish retired Gaelic footballer
 Des O'Hagan (1934–2015), Irish communist
 Desmond O'Malley (1939–2021), Irish politician, government minister and founder and leader of the Progressive Democrats
 Desmond Des O'Neil (1920–1999), Australian politician
 Des O'Reilly (1954–2016), Australian rugby league player
 Desmond Smith (general) (1911–1991), Canadian major-general
 Des Smith (headteacher), British headteacher embroiled in the Cash for Honours scandal
 Des Smith (ice hockey) (1914–1981), Canadian ice hockey defenceman
 Desmond Sinclair Des Walker (born 1965), English international footballer

Fictional characters 

 Desmond Des Barnes, in the British soap opera Coronation Street
 Desmond Des Clarke (Neighbours), in the Australian soap opera Neighbours
 Desmond Des Tiny, in the book series The Saga of Darren Shan

See also 

 DES (disambiguation)
 Dess (disambiguation)
 Dez (disambiguation)

Masculine given names
Hypocorisms
Irish masculine given names
English masculine given names